Dalma Caneva (born 6 May 1994) is an Italian wrestler who won a silver medal at the 2018 Mediterranean Games.

Biography
Before 2014 Dalma Caneva won five medals at youth level.

In March 2021, she competed at the European Qualification Tournament in Budapest, Hungary hoping to qualify for the 2020 Summer Olympics in Tokyo, Japan. She won her first two matches but then lost her match in the semi-finals against Koumba Larroque of France. In May 2021, she failed to qualify for the Olympics at the World Olympic Qualification Tournament held in Sofia, Bulgaria.

In 2022, she won the bronze medal in the 68 kg event at the Mediterranean Games held in Oran, Algeria. She competed in the 68 kg event at the 2022 World Wrestling Championships held in Belgrade, Serbia.

She won the silver medal in the women's 72kg event at the 2023 Grand Prix Zagreb Open held in Zagreb, Croatia. She won the gold medal in her event at the 2023 Ibrahim Moustafa Tournament held in Alexandria, Egypt.

Achievements

National titles
 7 Senior Italian titles

Participations
 3 Senior World Championships (2013, 2014, 2015)
 4 Senior European Championships (2013, 2015, 2016, 2018)

See also
 Italy at the 2018 Mediterranean Games

References

External links
 Dalma Caneva profile at CONI
 Dalma Caneva profile at Centro Sportivo Esercito
 

1994 births
Living people
Italian female sport wrestlers
Wrestlers of Gruppo Sportivo Esercito
Sportspeople from Genoa
Competitors at the 2018 Mediterranean Games
Competitors at the 2022 Mediterranean Games
Mediterranean Games silver medalists for Italy
Mediterranean Games bronze medalists for Italy
Mediterranean Games medalists in wrestling
Wrestlers at the 2015 European Games
European Games competitors for Italy
European Wrestling Championships medalists
21st-century Italian women